Mark Peter Christian (born 20 November 1990) is a Manx racing cyclist, who currently rides for UCI ProTeam .

A former member of the Great Britain Olympic Development Program, Christian won a bronze medal for the Isle of Man at the 2010 Commonwealth Games in the  Scratch Race. He is the brother of fellow racing cyclist Anna Christian.

Professional background
In 2007, Christian was signed to the British Olympic Development Program. In 2008, he won the Junioren Rundfahrt in Germany, and picked up a number of medals at the European Track Championships.

In February 2009, Christian was selected for Great Britain at the World Cup in Copenhagen. Later that month, he picked up the British Madison title in Manchester, alongside fellow Manxman Peter Kennaugh. In July, he won silver in the under-23 team pursuit and bronze in the under-23 points race at the European Track Championships in Belarus.

In 2010, Christian was confirmed as part of the Isle of Man squad for the 2010 Commonwealth Games. On 6 October, he finished third in the final of the 40 km Points race in Delhi to win the bronze medal. He also reached the final of the scratch race at the Commonwealth Games, finishing sixth.

Christian began 2011 at the UCI Track World Cup in Beijing. He picked up a bronze medal as part of the team pursuit.

In November 2011, Christian signed for professional UCI team .

Christian won the British Madison title for the 3rd time in January 2012, alongside Simon Yates.

He joined  for the 2013 season. In 2015 Christian moved to the new  team set up by Bradley Wiggins aiming to prepare British riders for the team pursuit at the 2016 Summer Olympics. Christian joined the  squad for its inaugural season in 2017.

He was named in the startlist for the 2017 Vuelta a España.

Major results

2008
 National Junior Track Championships
1st  Individual pursuit
1st  Points race
 Junior Tour of Wales
1st  Points classification
1st  Mountains classification
2009
 National Track Championships
1st  Madison (with Peter Kennaugh)
3rd  Scratch race
2010
 National Track Championships
1st  Madison (with Luke Rowe)
3rd  Points race
 7th ZLM Tour
 8th Overall Tour de Berlin
2011
 3rd  Points race, National Track Championships
2012
 1st  Madison (with Simon Yates), National Track Championships
2014
 1st  Madison (with Owain Doull), UCI Track World Cup, London
 2nd  Points race, National Track Championships
 2nd Beaumont Trophy
2016
 5th Overall Tour Alsace
 6th Overall Okolo Slovenska
2017
 7th Overall Tour de Yorkshire
2018
 1st  Mountains classification, Tour de Suisse
2019
 3rd Overall Tour of the Reservoir

Grand Tour general classification results timeline

References

External links

 

1990 births
Living people
British male cyclists
Manx male cyclists
Cyclists at the 2010 Commonwealth Games
Cyclists at the 2014 Commonwealth Games
Commonwealth Games bronze medallists for the Isle of Man
Commonwealth Games medallists in cycling
People from Douglas, Isle of Man
Medallists at the 2010 Commonwealth Games